CBX may refer to:

 CBX (AM), a radio station (740 AM) licensed to Edmonton, Alberta, Canada
 CBX-FM, a radio station (90.9 FM) licensed to Edmonton, Alberta, Canada
 Cross Border Xpress, bridge to and terminal in San Diego at Tijuana Airport
 Honda CBX, a six-cylinder motorcycle made by Honda from 1978 to 1982
 the family of Heterochromatin Protein 1 or "Chromobox Homolog" or short CBX, in molecular biology
 the IATA code for Condobolin Airport, Australia
 The Cross Bronx Expressway
 EXO-CBX, a subunit of K-pop band EXO
 Caramboxin, a toxin from carambola

See also
 Honda CBX (disambiguation), Honda motorcycles with model designations beginning with the prefix CBX